Atholstan Mahoney (15 July 1908 – 13 July 1979) was a New Zealand rugby union player. A loose forward, Mahoney represented Bush at a provincial level, and was a member of the New Zealand national side, the All Blacks, from 1929 to 1936. He played 26 matches for the All Blacks including four internationals.

He served with the 2nd New Zealand Expeditionary Force (2NZEF) during World War II, being taken prisoner of war in 1942.

Mahoney died at Pahiatua on 13 July 1979, and was buried at Pahiatua Mangatainoka Cemetery.

References

1908 births
1979 deaths
People from Woodville, New Zealand
People educated at St. Patrick's College, Wellington
New Zealand rugby union players
New Zealand international rugby union players
Bush rugby union players
New Zealand military personnel of World War II
New Zealand prisoners of war in World War II
Rugby union players from Manawatū-Whanganui